Dublin South was a parliamentary constituency represented in Dáil Éireann, the lower house of the Irish parliament or Oireachtas, from 1981 to 2016 representing an area in the south of County Dublin (later Dún Laoghaire–Rathdown and South Dublin). The method of election was proportional representation by means of the single transferable vote (PR-STV).

History and boundaries
Dublin South existed as a Dáil constituency from 1981 to 2016.

Constituency profile
It was one of Ireland's most affluent constituencies, the 2006 Census reported that residents tended to have higher-than-average levels of educational attainment, especially in terms of third-level qualifications, and were much more likely to work in professional and managerial positions. "Volatile, unpredictable and utterly ruthless, Dublin South voters have hired and fired TDs with abandon over the years" – The Irish Times description of the constituency in August 2012.

TDs

Elections

2011 general election

2009 by-election
Following the death of Fianna Fáil TD Séamus Brennan, a by-election was held on 5 June 2009. The seat was won by the Fine Gael candidate George Lee.

2007 general election

2002 general election

1997 general election

1992 general election

1989 general election

1987 general election

November 1982 general election

February 1982 general election

1981 general election

See also
Politics of the Republic of Ireland
Historic Dáil constituencies
Elections in the Republic of Ireland

References

External links
Oireachtas Members Database
Dublin Historic Maps: Townlands of County Dublin

Dáil constituencies in County Dublin (historic)
1981 establishments in Ireland
Constituencies established in 1981
2016 disestablishments in Ireland
Constituencies disestablished in 2016